Pessoa: A Biography is a biographical book on Fernando Pessoa by Richard Zenith.

Critical reception 
The book has been reviewed by Brinda Bose of Telegraph India, Parul Sehgal of The New York Times and David Sexton of The Times.

Accolades 
The book was selected as one of the best biographies of 2021 by Kirkus Reviews, and as one of the New York Times Critics' Top Books of 2021. It was a finalist for 2022 Pulitzer Prize for Biography or Autobiography.

References 

2021 non-fiction books
English-language books
W. W. Norton & Company books